Chromis sanctaehelenae is a species of fish, in the family Pomacentridae.

Habitat
It is endemic to Saint Helena. 

The adults occur in rocky or rubble reefs.

Behaviour
They are oviparous, and they form pairs during spawning. 

The eggs are demersal, adhering to the substrate, and are guarded and aerated by the male.

References

Sources

sanctaehelenae
Fauna of Saint Helena Island
Fish described in 1987
Taxonomy articles created by Polbot